The Nigerian National Assembly delegation from Osun State comprises three Senators and nine Representatives.

9th Assembly (2019-till date)

8th Assembly (2015–2019)

6th Assembly (2007–2011)

The 6th National Assembly (2007–2011) was inaugurated on 5 June 2007.
The People's Democratic Party (PDP) won all three Senate and ten House seats

Senators representing Osun State in the 6th Assembly were:

Representatives in the 6th Assembly were:

See also
Senate of Nigeria
Nigerian National Assembly

References

Osun State
National Assembly (Nigeria) delegations by state